Spilopodia is a genus of fungi in the family Dermateaceae. The genus contains 4 species.

See also
 List of Dermateaceae genera

References

External links
Spilopodia at Index Fungorum

Dermateaceae genera